Ashima Narwal is an Indian model and actress. In 2015, she won two titles in two different beauty pageants, Miss Sydney Australia Elegance and Miss India Global.

Early life
Ashima Narwal was born in Haryana, India. She finished school at Rohtak, Haryana and then moved to Australia for higher studies. She has a bachelor's degree in nursing from the University of Technology Sydney.

Filmography

Honours
 2015 - Miss Sydney Australia Elegance
 2015 - Miss India Global

References

External links

Living people
People from Rohtak
Actresses from Haryana
Female models from Haryana
Indian film actresses
Actresses in Telugu cinema
Actresses in Tamil cinema
Indian expatriates in Australia
University of Technology Sydney alumni
21st-century Indian actresses
Year of birth missing (living people)